Drevja Church is a parish church of the Church of Norway in Vefsn Municipality in Nordland county, Norway. It is located in the Drevja area of northern Vefsn. It is the church for the Drevja parish which is part of the Indre Helgeland prosti (deanery) in the Diocese of Sør-Hålogaland. The red, wooden church was built in a long church style in 1883 by the architects Andreas Grenstad and Torolf Prytz. The church seats about 200 people. The church was consecrated on 28 September 1883.

See also
List of churches in Sør-Hålogaland

References

Vefsn
Churches in Nordland
Wooden churches in Norway
19th-century Church of Norway church buildings
Churches completed in 1883
1883 establishments in Norway
Long churches in Norway